Adhemarius globifer is a species of moth in the family Sphingidae. It was described by Harrison Gray Dyar Jr. and 1912, and is found from Mexico to southern Arizona.

Adults are probably on wing year round.

References

Adhemarius
Moths described in 1912
Moths of North America